Moca humbertella is a moth in the family Immidae. It was described by Viette in 1956. It is found on Madagascar.

References

Moths described in 1956
Immidae
Moths of Madagascar